Éric Leichtnam is director of research at the CNRS at the Institut de Mathématiques de Jussieu in Paris. His fields of interest are noncommutative geometry, ergodic theory, Dirichlet problem, non-commutative residue.

Selected publications

Gérard, Patrick; Leichtnam, Éric: Ergodic properties of eigenfunctions for the Dirichlet problem. Duke Math. J. 71 (1993), no. 2, 559–607.
Fedosov, Boris V.; Golse, François; Leichtnam, Eric; Schrohe, Elmar: The noncommutative residue for ----- (1996), no. 1, 1–31.
Leichtnam, E.; Piazza, P.: Spectral sections and higher Atiyah–Patodi–Singer index theory on Galois coverings. Geometric and Functional Analysis 8 (1998), no. 1, 17–58.
.

External links
 personal page

21st-century French mathematicians
Living people
Year of birth missing (living people)
Research directors of the French National Centre for Scientific Research